Neville Godwin was the defending champion but lost in the first round to Jeff Morrison.

Taylor Dent won in the final 6–1, 4–6, 6–4 against James Blake.

Seeds
A champion seed is indicated in bold text while text in italics indicates the round in which that seed was eliminated.

  James Blake (final)
  Wayne Arthurs (first round)
  Julian Knowle (second round)
  Jeff Morrison (second round)
  Alexander Popp (quarterfinals)
  Cecil Mamiit (first round)
  Michaël Llodra (semifinals)
  Jürgen Melzer (first round)

Draw

References
 2002 Miller Lite Hall of Fame Championships Draw

2002 Hall of Fame Tennis Championships